Fournier Bay is a bay  long and  wide, indenting the northeast coast of Anvers Island immediately west of Briggs Peninsula and south of Dralfa Point, in the Palmer Archipelago, Antarctica. Its head is fed by Rhesus, Thamyris, Kleptuza and Altimir Glaciers.

The bay was probably first seen by a German expedition, 1873–74, under Eduard Dallmann. It was charted by the French Antarctic Expedition, 1903–05, under Jean-Baptiste Charcot, and named by him for Vice Admiral Ernest Fournier of the French Navy.

See also
Gerlache Strait Geology
Anvers Island Geology

References 

Bays of the Palmer Archipelago